Helena College University of Montana is a public community college in Helena, Montana. It was established in 1939 and was previously known as The University of Montana – Helena College of Technology, Helena College of Technology, and the Helena Vocational-Technical Center. The school offers associate degrees in arts, science, and applied science as well as technical proficiency certificates in various fields.

References

External links
 Official website

Buildings and structures in Helena, Montana
Education in Lewis and Clark County, Montana
Educational institutions established in 1939
Universities and colleges accredited by the Northwest Commission on Colleges and Universities
University of Montana System
1939 establishments in Montana
Two-year colleges in the United States
Helena College University of Montana